is a Japanese badminton player. He is a member of the Nihon Unisys team, and national team A representative. Known for his quick and explosive movements with signature drop shots on court, Watanabe has won the mixed doubles bronze medal at the 2020 Summer Olympics, as well as being three-times BWF World Championships medalists.

Career overview

Early years 

Watanabe started his career in badminton when he join the Kodaira junior club in Tokyo in 2005. He had shown his talent in badminton when he won some national event when he was in the elementary school. He made a partnership with Arisa Higashino as his senior in Tomioka Dai-ichi Junior High School in 2012.

Watanabe was selected to join national junior team competed at the 2014 Asian Junior Championships, and helped the team win the mixed team bronze medal. He also settled for another bronze medal in the boys' doubles event partnered with Kenya Mitsuhashi. At the World Junior Championships in Alor Setar, Malaysia, he won the bronze medals in the mixed doubles event with Arisa Higashino and in the mixed team event. In June 2014, he made his first appearance in the senior international event at the Japan Open, competed in the mixed doubles with Higashino, but the duo was defeated in the first round. He captured two titles at the 2014 Korea Junior Open in the boys' and mixed doubles event teamed-up with Mitsuhashi and Chiharu Shida respectively.

Watanabe started the 2015 season, by winning the boys' doubles title at the Dutch Junior tournament with Kenya Mitsuhashi, and finished as the semifinalist in the mixed doubles with Chiharu Shida, and later won the mixed doubles title in German Junior tournament. In July, he competed at the Asian Junior Championships, clinched the bronze medals in the boys' singles and mixed team events. He reached his first final in the senior international event at the 2015 Russian Open a BWF Grand Prix tournament. At the Danish Junior Cup, he clinched two titles by winning the boys' singles and doubles events. In November, he won the boys' doubles bronze medal at the World Junior Championships in Lima, Peru.

Watanabe won his first senior international tournament at the Vietnam International Challenge in the mixed doubles event with Arisa Higashino, and also became the runner-up in the men's doubles event. Together with Higashino, they reached the 2018 All England Open final beating the top three seeds, and clinched the title after beating the fifth seeded pair from China Zheng Siwei and Huang Yaqiong in the rubber game.

2021 
In March, Watanabe won both the men's and mixed doubles disciplines in the All England Open with Hiroyuki Endo and Arisa Higashino. He was the first player in over 19 years to accomplish such a feat. In July, he competed at the 2020 Tokyo Olympics in the men's doubles partnering Endo, and in the mixed doubles with Higashino. Watanabe and Endo's pace was stopped in the quarter-finals to eventual gold medalists Lee Yang and Wang Chi-lin, while in the mixed doubles, Watanabe and Higashino clinched a bronze medal after winning the bronze medal game against Tang Chun Man and Tse Ying Suet in straight games.

Achievements

Olympic Games 
Mixed doubles

BWF World Championships 
Mixed doubles

Asian Championships 
Men's doubles

Mixed doubles

BWF World Junior Championships 
Boys' doubles

Mixed doubles

Asian Junior Championships 
Boys' singles

Boys' doubles

BWF World Tour (13 titles, 12 runners-up) 
The BWF World Tour, which was announced on 19 March 2017 and implemented in 2018, is a series of elite badminton tournaments sanctioned by the Badminton World Federation (BWF). The BWF World Tour is divided into levels of World Tour Finals, Super 1000, Super 750, Super 500, Super 300, and the BWF Tour Super 100.

Men's doubles

Mixed doubles

BWF Grand Prix (1 runner-up) 
The BWF Grand Prix had two levels, the Grand Prix and Grand Prix Gold. It was a series of badminton tournaments sanctioned by the Badminton World Federation (BWF) and played between 2007 and 2017.

Mixed doubles

  BWF Grand Prix Gold tournament
  BWF Grand Prix tournament

BWF International Challenge/Series (1 title, 2 runners-up) 
Men's doubles

Mixed doubles

  BWF International Challenge tournament
  BWF International Series tournament

Performance timeline

National team 
 Junior level

 Senior level

Individual competitions

Junior level 
 Boys' singles

 Boys' doubles

 Mixed doubles

Senior level

Men's singles

Men's doubles

Mixed doubles

References

External links 
 
  
  
  

1997 births
Living people
People from Suginami
Japanese male badminton players
Badminton players at the 2020 Summer Olympics
Olympic badminton players of Japan
Olympic bronze medalists for Japan
Olympic medalists in badminton
Medalists at the 2020 Summer Olympics
Badminton players at the 2018 Asian Games
Asian Games bronze medalists for Japan
Asian Games medalists in badminton
Medalists at the 2018 Asian Games
World No. 1 badminton players
21st-century Japanese people